Behningiidae is a family of mayflies. It is a primitive family; the nymphs burrow in the sediment but lack tusks on their mandibles, and the forelegs are not modified for burrowing. The gills are ventral, and the ones on the first abdominal segment are single and are longer than the gills on the other segments. The forelegs are palp-like and the other two pairs of legs are modified to protect the gills. The family is holarctic in distribution. The genus Dolania occurs in North America and the other three genera occur in northern Europe and Asia.

Genera
The family includes the following genera:

 †Archaeobehningia Tshernova, 1977
 Behningia Lestage, 1930
 Dolania Edmunds & Traver, 1959
 Protobehningia Tshernova & Bajkova, 1960

References

Mayflies
Insect families